Butko is a Ukrainian surname and Russian surname. Notable people with the surname include:

 Aleksandr Butko
 Bohdan Butko (born 1991), Ukrainian footballer
 Oleksandr Butko (born 1957), Ukrainian journalist, editor, and television manager

See also
 

Ukrainian-language surnames